CHKG-FM is a radio station in Vancouver, British Columbia, Canada. It broadcasts on the frequency 96.1 FM. It airs mostly Mandarin programming and is owned by the Fairchild Group. CHKG's studios are located inside Aberdeen Centre in Richmond, while its transmitter is located atop Mount Seymour.

History
In 1995, the Fairchild Group, which already owned Vancouver multicultural station CJVB (1470 AM), and Roger Charest, owner of CKER in Edmonton, made a joint bid to the CRTC to establish FM world music stations in Vancouver and Calgary. The application was approved in 1996, with the Canadian Radio-television and Telecommunications Commission (CRTC) selecting it over bids from Telemedia for an alternative rock station and Radio One Vancouver Corporation for an "adult/pop talk" station because it found that the Vancouver radio market could not support another general-market station; CHMB (1320 AM) also proposed an ethnic station but withdrew its proposal.

CHKG-FM began broadcasting on September 6, 1997. It was the fifth Fairchild ethnic media service to open, and the first multilingual FM station in Western Canada. Programming was split between world music from 6:00 a.m. to 3:00 p.m. and Chinese hit radio the rest of the day, which together with CJVB's daytime Chinese programming provided a 24-hour Chinese service while also catering to other communities.

CHKG has held subsidiary communications multiplex operation authority from the CRTC over most of its history to broadcast a subcarrier-only service, originally in Korean and later in Punjabi. By the 2015 renewal, the SCMO service had returned to Korean.

Programming

CHKG operates with a program schedule that generally is the inverse of CJVB. During the day from Monday to Saturday, it airs world music programming and programs in Filipino, German, Hungarian, Italian, Khmer, Korean, Lao, Macedonian, Polish, Russian, Spanish, Thai, and Vietnamese. The weekly Asian Influence program presents the Chinese, Korean, and Japanese pop charts. The conditions of CHKG-FM's licence prevent it from airing Chinese-language programs between 6:00 a.m. and 3:00 p.m. After 3:00 p.m. and all day on Sundays, CHKG-FM presents Cantonese and Mandarin Chinese shows.

References

External links
Fairchild Radio
 
 

Hkg
Hkg
CHKG
Radio stations established in 1997
1997 establishments in British Columbia